Wake Christian Academy (WCA) is a private, Christian, co-educational school in Raleigh, North Carolina, United States. It was established in 1966 as a segregation academy in response to the racial integration of public schools.

History 
Wake Christian Academy was established in 1966 as Wake Academy by a group of segregationists that included L. C. Purdy, a former president of White Citizens' Councils. Purdy, along with the White Citizens' Council, tried to raise funds in time to open a school building in the fall of 1966, but fell short and had to lease a residence in which to operate the school. School board president H.W. Carey, referencing the founding of the school, told the News & Observer that   he "hope[ed] the school would be known for its quality education, but it would be false if I said integration didn't enter into it".

In 1969, Purdy told a reporter that "all you get in public schools is integration, not education. The children are pawns in sociological experiments". Principal Franklin Pierce said that although the school was formed to maintain segregation, she was seeking to change the school's image.

In 1970, North Carolina Supreme Court justice I. Beverly Lake Jr. gave a speech to students and parents at the school in which he denounced school desegregation. Lake noted "the products of jungles" were enrolling in public education and opined that all white private schools like Wake Christian Academy "offer to our state her best hope for safe passage through perilous times." In May 1970, School founder L. C. Purdy was also a leader of the local chapter  of the White Citizens Council and campaigned against a public school bond issue on the grounds the funds would "be used more integration than for education".

In 1971, L. C. Purdy, by then a member of board of directors, told a reporter that no black students had applied and that he was not sure if the school would admit a black student.

In 1973, Wake Christian Academy's tax exempt status was revoked after a federal court found that the school would not admit black students. In response to the ruling, board member L. C. Purdy commented "we are not going let the federal government dictate our admissions policies, even if it means losing our tax exempt status".

In 1980, Midway Christian Schools merged into Wake Christian.

On September 16, 2015, the school officially opened a new field house known as the Fidelity Bank Field House, in a ribbon-cutting ceremony at the school. It would support its football, baseball, softball and soccer programs.

References

External links 
 

Private schools in Raleigh, North Carolina
Private elementary schools in North Carolina
Private middle schools in North Carolina
Private high schools in North Carolina
Christian schools in North Carolina
Segregation academies in North Carolina
Nondenominational Christian schools in the United States
Educational institutions established in 1966
1966 establishments in North Carolina